Elizabeth is a city in Otter Tail County, Minnesota, United States. The population was 168 at the 2020 census.

History
Elizabeth was platted in 1872, and named for Elizabeth Niggler, the wife of an early settler. A post office was established under the name Elizabethtown in 1871, and the name was changed to Elizabeth in 1882.

Geography

Demographics

2010 census
As of the census of 2010, there were 173 people, 66 households, and 49 families living in the city. The racial makeup of the city was 93.6% White, 2.9% African American, 1.7% Native American, 0.6% Asian, and 1.2% from two or more races.

There were 66 households, of which 30.3% had children under the age of 18 living with them, 65.2% were married couples living together, 4.5% had a female householder with no husband present, 4.5% had a male householder with no wife present, and 25.8% were non-families. 19.7% of all households were made up of individuals, and 3% had someone living alone who was 65 years of age or older. The average household size was 2.62 and the average family size was 3.08.

The median age in the city was 43.8 years. 24.3% of residents were under the age of 18; 5.1% were between the ages of 18 and 24; 24.3% were from 25 to 44; 34.7% were from 45 to 64; and 11.6% were 65 years of age or older. The gender makeup of the city was 54.9% male and 45.1% female.

2000 census
As of the census of 2000, there were 172 people, 72 households, and 42 families living in the city. The racial makeup of the city was 98.26% White, 1.16% Native American, and 0.58% from two or more races.

There were 72 households, out of which 31.9% had children under the age of 18 living with them, 47.2% were married couples living together, 9.7% had a female householder with no husband present, and 40.3% were non-families. 30.6% of all households were made up of individuals, and 11.1% had someone living alone who was 65 years of age or older. The average household size was 2.39 and the average family size was 3.05.

In the city, the population was spread out, with 26.2% under the age of 18, 7.0% from 18 to 24, 31.4% from 25 to 44, 24.4% from 45 to 64, and 11.0% who were 65 years of age or older. The median age was 38 years. For every 100 females, there were 112.3 males. For every 100 females age 18 and over, there were 104.8 males.

The median income for a household in the city was $33,438, and the median income for a family was $38,333. Males had a median income of $28,750 versus $20,625 for females. The per capita income for the city was $13,841. About 2.1% of families and 8.0% of the population were below the poverty line, including 6.0% of those under the age of eighteen and none of those 65 or over.

Climate
The Köppen Climate Classification subtype for this climate is "Dfb". (Warm Summer Continental Climate).

References

Cities in Minnesota
Cities in Otter Tail County, Minnesota